Fábio Lopes may refer to:

 Fábio Lopes (footballer, born 1977) (Fábio Lopes Alcântara), Brazilian footballer
 Fábio Lopes (footballer, born 1985) (Fábio Rogério Correa Lopes), Brazilian footballer
 Fábio Lopes (footballer, born 1993) (Fábio Miguel Rico Lopes), Portuguese footballer
 Fábio Lopes (footballer, born 2001) (Fábio Jardel Veríssimo Lopes), Portuguese footballer
 Fabio Lopez, Italian football manager